Li Ting and Sun Tiantian were the defending champions, but both chose not to participate that year.

Seeds

  Gisela Dulko /  Flavia Pennetta (first round)
  Marion Bartoli /  Maria Kirilenko (first round)
  Eleni Daniilidou /  Jasmin Wöhr (semifinals, retired due to Daniilidou' s left calf strain)
 Andreea Ehritt-Vanc /  Anastasia Rodionova (champions)

Draw

Draw

External links
Draws

Portugal Open
Estoril Open
Estoril Open